Mark Richard David Parsons (born 8 August 1986) is an English football manager who is currently the head coach of American club Washington Spirit. He previously managed top-level teams including the Netherlands women's national team, the Portland Thorns FC, and the Washington Spirit in a previous stint.

Parsons holds USSF and UEFA A & B Licenses, a USSF Pro License, a USSF National Youth License and a NSCAA Director of Coaching Diploma.

Managerial career

Chelsea Reserves
Parsons spent six years in multiple coaching roles in England, including time spent as the head coach of Chelsea Reserves which he led to an unprecedented treble in his first season.

DC United Women Under-20s
In 2012, Parsons led the D.C. United Women Under-20s to the 2012 Super-20 League final, which they lost to Colorado Rapids Women.

Washington Spirit Reserves
Parsons was signed by Washington Spirit on 16 March 2013 to manage their reserve team for the 2013 W-League season.

Washington Spirit (1)
Following the dismissal of Washington Spirit manager Mike Jorden in July 2013, Parsons was promoted to be the first team manager. The team was at the bottom of the table halfway through the 2013 season when Parsons took over, but he led them to their first two home wins in 2013 and into the playoffs in both the 2014 and 2015 seasons.

Parsons stepped down from his position as head coach and GM of the Washington Spirit on 30 September 2015.

Portland Thorns
On 5 October 2015, Parsons accepted the position as head coach of Portland Thorns FC.

He led a new-look team through a 12-game undefeated streak (a team record) from the beginning of the 2016 season. The team finished as the regular season champions, winning the NWSL Shield, but fell to the Western New York Flash in the Thorns' first-ever home playoff match on 2 October 2016.

The Thorns repeated in securing a home playoff match in the 2017 season despite of suffering numerous injuries to the first XI throughout the season, including the long-term absence of star Tobin Heath. After beating the Orlando Pride 4–1 in the semifinal, the Thorns won the NWSL championship by defeating the North Carolina Courage 1–0 in the final.

In March 2020 Mark Parsons signed a new multi-year contract with Portland.

In 2021 Parsons led the Thorns to the NWSL Shield for the second time. In addition, the team also won the NWSL Challenge Cup, beating NJ/NY Gotham FC in the final, and the Women's International Champions Cup, beating Olympique Lyonnais in the final. The team also set the NWSL single-season record for shutouts, with 13 out of 24 games played.

Overall, Thorns FC under Parsons made the playoffs all five seasons, won two NWSL Shields and one NWSL Championship, and scored 182 goals, more than any other NWSL team in that time. Parsons became the winningest coach in NWSL history, with 82 victories.

Netherlands
On 20 May 2021, the KNVB announced that Parsons would succeed Sarina Wiegman as head coach of the Netherlands women's national football team after the conclusion of the 2020 Summer Olympics; he continued to coach the Portland Thorns until November 2021 after the season finished, when the position was taken over by Rhian Wilkinson.

On 10 August 2022, Parsons' contract with KNVB was terminated by mutual consent, after the Netherlands team failed in the defense of their 2017 title in the UEFA Women's Euro 2022 competition.

Washington Spirit (2) 
On 21 November 2022, Parsons was announced as the head coach for the Washington Spirit, succeeding Kris Ward as head coach and Albertin Montoya as interim head coach.

Managerial statistics

Personal life
Parsons is British and also holds US citizenship.

Honours 
Portland Thorns FC
 NWSL Championship: 2017
 NWSL Shield: 2016, 2021
 NWSL Challenge Cup: 2021
 NWSL Community Shield: 2020
 WICC Championship: 2021

Individual
 NWSL Coach of the Year: 2016

References

External links

1986 births
Living people
People from Cranleigh
Sportspeople from Surrey
English football managers
National Women's Soccer League coaches
Washington Spirit coaches
Portland Thorns FC coaches
English expatriate football managers
English expatriate sportspeople in the United States
Expatriate soccer managers in the United States
Netherlands women's national football team managers
UEFA Women's Euro 2022 managers
English expatriate sportspeople in the Netherlands
Expatriate football managers in the Netherlands
Chelsea F.C. non-playing staff
D.C. United non-playing staff